The First Taiwan Strait Crisis (also the Formosa Crisis, the 1954–1955 Taiwan Strait Crisis, the Offshore Islands Crisis, the Quemoy-Matsu Crisis, and the 1955 Taiwan Strait Crisis) was a brief armed conflict between the Communist People's Republic of China (PRC) and the Nationalist Republic of China (ROC) in Taiwan. The conflict focused on several groups of islands in the Taiwan Strait that were held by the ROC but were located only a few miles from mainland China. The crisis began when the PRC shelled the ROC-held island of Kinmen (Quemoy). Later, the PRC seized the Yijiangshan Islands from the ROC. Under pressure by the PRC, the ROC then abandoned the Tachen Islands (Dachen Islands), which were evacuated by the navies of the ROC and the US.

In 1949, the Chinese Civil War ended with the victory of the Communist People's Republic of China (PRC). The government of the Republic of China (ROC), controlled by ROC president Chiang Kai-shek and the Kuomintang (KMT), and 1.3 million anti-Communist Chinese supporters fled from mainland China. The ROC government relocated to the island of Taiwan. The territory under ROC control was reduced to Taiwan, Hainan, the Pescadores Islands (Penghu), a strip of territory along the China-Burma border and several island groups along the south-east coast of China. In April 1950, the PRC captured Hainan. ROC forces there evacuated to Taiwan in May 1950.

Background
While the United States recognized Chiang Kai-shek's Nationalist (Kuomintang) government as the sole legitimate government for all of China, U.S. President Harry S. Truman announced on 5 January 1950 that the United States would not engage in any intervention in the Taiwan Strait disputes, and that he would not intervene in the event of an attack by the PRC.  However, after the outbreak of the Korean War on 25 June 1950, Truman declared that the "neutralization of the Straits of Formosa" was in the best interest of the United States, and he sent the U.S. Navy's Seventh Fleet into the Taiwan Strait to prevent any conflict between the Republic of China and the People's Republic of China, effectively putting Taiwan under American protection.  The move was also intended to deter ROC attacks against the Chinese Mainland.

On 27 June 1950, President Truman issued the following statement:

President Truman later ordered John Foster Dulles, the Foreign Policy Advisor to U.S. Secretary of State Dean Acheson, to carry out his decision on "neutralizing"  Taiwan in drafting the Treaty of San Francisco of 1951 (the peace treaty with Japan), which excluded the participation of both the ROC and the PRC.  Each self-claimed legitimate government of China was excluded from the treaty because the question of China's legitimate government remained unresolved after World War II and the Chinese Civil War, and this was considered an intractable sticking point in otherwise comprehensive and multilaterally beneficial peace negotiations.

Japan ceded control of Taiwan in the treaty but did not specify a recipient for Taiwan's sovereignty.  This situation has been used by supporters of Taiwan independence to argue for their position that the sovereignty status of Taiwan was undetermined, despite the Japanese having already agreed to return Taiwan to Republic of China through their Instrument of Surrender signed at end of the War.  According to the author George H. Kerr, a supporter of Taiwanese independence, in his book Formosa Betrayed, the political status of Taiwan was under the trust of the Allied Powers (against Japan). It would be the responsibility of the United Nations if this could not be resolved in near future as designed in the peace treaty.

The ROC Nationalist Government (now based in Taiwan) maintained as its goal the recovery of control of mainland China, and this required a resumption of the military confrontation with the Red Chinese.  Truman and his advisors regarded that goal as unrealizable, but regret over losing China to international communism was quite prominent in public opinion at the time, and the Truman Administration was criticized by anticommunists for preventing any attempt by Chiang Kai-shek's forces to liberate mainland China.

Truman, a member of the Democratic Party, did not run for reelection in the presidential election of 1952, even though he was eligible to do so. This election was won by the Republican Dwight D. Eisenhower, a General from World War II.

On 2 February 1953, the new president lifted the Seventh Fleet's blockade in order to fulfill demands by anticommunists to "unleash Chiang Kai-shek" on mainland China, hence the Kuomintang regime strengthened its Closed Port Policy of the aerial and naval blockade on foreign vessels on Chinese coast and the high seas, whereas the privacy activities intensified in the summer 1953 after Joseph Stalin's death and the Korean Armistice Agreement till summed up to 141 interference incidents as per the Royal Navy escort reports.

The CIA briefing on 13 July 1954 for the White House and NSC indicated the shipping insurance increasement across the South China Sea after the Tuapse Incident on 23 June, and certain international liners being deterred midway at Singapore, or had to change plans. The PLA Air Force moved in the Hainan Island to clear another transport route through Yulin and Huangpu ports, but accidentally shot down a Douglas DC-4 (VR-HEU) airliner of the Cathay Pacific Airways with 10 deaths on 23 July, then 2 US aircraft carriers, Hornet and Philippine Sea arrived for a rescue mission on 26 July and shot down 2 PLAAF Lavochkin La-11 fighters . On 2 August, Commander of PLA in the Central Military Commission (CMC), Peng Dehuai convened an executive meeting to establish the tactical command on the East China Military Region as per CMC chairman Mao Zedong's directive to open another front from the north.

The conflict
In August 1954, the Nationalists placed 58,000 troops on Kinmen and 15,000 troops on Matsu. The ROC began building defensive structures and the PRC began shelling ROC installations on Kinmen. Zhou Enlai, PRC premier responded with a declaration on 11 August 1954, that Taiwan must be "liberated."  He dispatched the People's Liberation Army (PLA) to the area, and it began shelling both Kinmen and the Matsu Islands.

Despite warnings from the U.S. against any attacks on the Republic of China; five days before the signing of the Manila pact, the PLA unleashed a heavy artillery bombardment of Kinmen on September 3, during which two American military advisers were killed.
In November, the PLA bombed the Tachen Islands. This renewed Cold War fears of Communist expansion in Asia at a time when the PRC was not recognized by the United States Department of State.  Chiang Kai-shek's government was supported by the United States because the ROC was part of the United States policy of containment of communism which stretched from a devastated South Korea to an increasingly divided Southeast Asia.

On 12 September, the U.S. Joint Chiefs of Staff recommended the use of nuclear weapons against mainland China. President Eisenhower, however, resisted pressure to use nuclear weapons or involve American troops in the conflict. However, on 2 December 1954, the United States and the ROC agreed to the Sino-American Mutual Defense Treaty, which did not apply to islands along the Chinese mainland. This treaty was ratified by the U.S. Senate on 9 February 1955.

The PLA seized the Yijiangshan Islands on 18 January 1955. Fighting continued in nearby islands off the coast of Zhejiang, as well as around Kinmen and the Matsu Islands in Fujian. On 29 January 1955, the Formosa Resolution was approved by both houses of the U.S. Congress authorizing Eisenhower to use U.S. forces to defend the ROC and its possessions in the Taiwan Strait against armed attack. The U.S. Navy then assisted the Nationalists in evacuating their forces from the Tachen Islands.

In February, British Prime Minister Winston Churchill warned the U.S. against using nuclear weapons, but in March, U.S. Secretary of State John Foster Dulles stated publicly that the U.S. was seriously considering a nuclear strike. In response, the NATO foreign ministers warned at a meeting of the alliance against such action. In late March, U.S. Admiral Robert B. Carney said that Eisenhower is planning "to destroy Red China's military potential."

At the April 1955 Bandung Conference, China articulated its Five Principles of Peaceful Coexistence and Premier Zhou Enlai publicly stated, "[T]he Chinese people do not want to have a war with the United States. The Chinese government is willing to sit down to discuss the question of relaxing tension in the Far East, and especially the question of relaxing tension in the Taiwan area." The crisis de-escalated, and the United States and China began ambassadorial-level discussions in Geneva on August 1, 1955. Two years of negotiations with the United States followed, and covered many issues, although no agreement was reached on the primary issue, Taiwan.

Aftermath
Some scholars hypothesized the PRC backed down in the face of American nuclear brinksmanship and in light of the lack of willingness by the Soviet Union to threaten nuclear retaliation for an attack on the PRC. Others see the case as an example of effective application of extended deterrence by the United States. On 1 May the PLA temporarily ceased shelling Kinmen and Matsu. The fundamental issues of the conflict remained unresolved, however, and both sides subsequently built up their military forces on their respective sides of the Taiwan Strait leading to a new crisis three years later.

There are strong indications that Mao used the crisis in order to provoke the United States into making nuclear threats, which would give him domestic support to pour money into research and production of Chinese nuclear weapons and missile technology. After American nuclear threats during the First Taiwan Strait Crisis, the Politburo gave the green light in 1955 to pursue nuclear weapons and missile research. The first of China's nuclear weapons tests took place in 1964 and its first successful hydrogen bomb test occurred in 1967.

See also
 Battle of Kuningtou
 Battle of Hainan Island
 Kashmir Princess
 Capture of Tanker Tuapse
 Second Taiwan Strait Crisis
 Third Taiwan Strait Crisis
 Legal status of Taiwan
 Nuclear blackmail

Notes

References

Further reading

Bush, R. & O'Hanlon, M. (2007). A War Like No Other: The Truth About China's Challenge to America. Wiley. 
Bush, R. (2006). Untying the Knot: Making Peace in the Taiwan Strait. Brookings Institution Press. 
Carpenter, T. (2006). America's Coming War with China: A Collision Course over Taiwan. Palgrave Macmillan. 
Cole, B. (2006). Taiwan's Security: History and Prospects. Routledge. 
Copper, J. (2006). Playing with Fire: The Looming War with China over Taiwan. Praeger Security International General Interest. 
Federation of American Scientists et al. (2006). Chinese Nuclear Forces and U.S. Nuclear War Planning
Gill, B. (2007). Rising Star: China's New Security Diplomacy. Brookings Institution Press. 
Rushkoff, Bennett C. "Eisenhower, Dulles and the Quemoy-Matsu Crisis, 1954-1955." Political Science Quarterly 96, no. 3 (1981): 465–80. 
Shirk, S. (2007). China: Fragile Superpower: How China's Internal Politics Could Derail Its Peaceful Rise. Oxford University Press. 
Tsang, S. (2006). If China Attacks Taiwan: Military Strategy, Politics and Economics. Routledge. 
Tucker, N.B. (2005). Dangerous Strait: the U.S.-Taiwan-China Crisis. Columbia University Press. 
 Watry, David M. Diplomacy at the Brink: Eisenhower, Churchill, and Eden in the Cold War. Baton Rouge: Louisiana State University Press, 2014.

Crisis
Conflicts in 1954
Conflicts in 1955
Taiwan under Republic of China rule
Taiwan 1954
Naval history of China
1954 in China
1955 in China
1954 in Taiwan
1955 in Taiwan
Presidency of Dwight D. Eisenhower
Cross-Strait conflict
China–United States military relations
Taiwan–United States military relations
Military history of Taiwan